Sondre Sørli (born 30 October 1995) is a Norwegian professional footballer who plays as a midfielder for Bodø/Glimt.

Career statistics

Club

Honours
Bodø/Glimt
Eliteserien: 2021

References

1995 births
Living people
Sportspeople from Kristiansund
Norwegian footballers
Association football midfielders
Eliteserien players
Norwegian First Division players
Kristiansund BK players
FK Bodø/Glimt players